Rubí Orlando Cerioni (1 May 1927 – 17 March 2012) was an Argentine footballer who played professionally in the Argentine Primera División, Fútbol Profesional Colombiano, Mexican Primera División, Chilean Primera División and Canadian National Soccer League.

Career
Born in La Plata, Cerioni played as a forward. He began his career with the youth side of Gimnasia de La Plata. He made two Primera División appearances for River Plate, before joining Argentine Primera B Nacional side Quilmes in 1949. Cerioni quickly became a part of the squad and helped Quilmes win the 1949 title. Over his two stints with the club, he scored 59 goals in 102 Primera and Primera B appearances for Quilmes.

In 1951, Cerioni moved to Colombia to play for Sporting de Barranquilla and Deportivo Cali. He returned to Quilmes, and spells with Atlas, Toronto Roma and O'Higgins followed before he retired in 1962.

Managerial career 
Cerioni served as a play-coach in 1964 for Toronto Roma in the Eastern Canada Professional Soccer League.

Personal
Cerioni died in March 2012.

References

External links
 Rubí Cerioni at BDFA.com.ar 

1927 births
2012 deaths
Argentine footballers
Argentine expatriate footballers
Club Atlético River Plate footballers
Quilmes Atlético Club footballers
Deportivo Cali footballers
Toronto Roma players
Atlas F.C. footballers
O'Higgins F.C. footballers
Argentine Primera División players
Canadian National Soccer League players
Categoría Primera A players
Chilean Primera División players
Eastern Canada Professional Soccer League players
Liga MX players
Expatriate footballers in Chile
Expatriate footballers in Mexico
Expatriate footballers in Colombia
Expatriate soccer players in Canada
Association football forwards
Footballers from La Plata